Lili Zhekova (born 22 April 1987) is a Bulgarian footballer who plays as a midfielder. She has been a member of the Bulgaria women's national team.

International career
Zhekova capped for Bulgaria at senior level during the 2011 FIFA Women's World Cup qualification – UEFA Group 3 and the UEFA Women's Euro 2013 qualifying Group 3.

References

1987 births
Living people
Women's association football midfielders
Bulgarian women's footballers
Bulgaria women's international footballers
FC NSA Sofia players
21st-century Bulgarian women